Greatest Hits Live is a live album by Boz Scaggs. It was released on August 17, 2004 by Mailboat Records.

Reception

Allmusic's retrospective review stated that "Even if it's a byproduct of the associated DVD recorded at the same August 2004 San Francisco gig, this is a lively and professionally performed show that makes up in soul what it lacks in spontaneity." They found the renditions of the songs to be generally strong, particularly the blues-based tracks ("Ask Me 'Bout Nuthin' but the Blues," "Runnin' Blue", and "Loan Me a Dime"). They also applauded the removal of the "rather forced between-song patter very present in the DVD".

Track listing
DISC 1:
 "Lowdown"
 "Slow Dancer"
 "Heart of Mine"
 "It All Went Down the Drain"
 "Harbor Lights"
 "Jojo"
 "Ask Me 'Bout Nothin' But the Blues"
 "Breakdown Dead Ahead"

DISC 2:
 "Look What You've Done to Me"
 "I Just Go"
 "Georgia"
 "Miss Sun"
 "Lido Shuffle"
 "Runnin' Blues"
 "Loan Me a Dime"
 "We're All Alone"

Personnel
 Boz Scaggs - vocals, guitar
 Drew Zingg - guitar
 Charles McNeal - saxophone
 Richard Armstrong - trumpet
 Jim Cox, Michael Bluestein - keyboards
 Matt Bissonette - bass
 John Ferraro - drums
 Barbara Wilson, Ms. Monét Owens - background vocals
 Recording information: Great American Music Hall, San Francisco, California.

References

External links
 Greatest Hits Live Lyrics

Boz Scaggs albums
2004 live albums
Mailboat Records live albums